Wiślinka  is a village in the administrative district of Gmina Pruszcz Gdański, within Gdańsk County, Pomeranian Voivodeship, in northern Poland. It is located within the historic region of Pomerania.

The village has a population of 939.

During World War II it was the location of a subcamp of the Stutthof concentration camp, in which the Germans imprisoned around 50 people as forced labour.

References

Villages in Gdańsk County